Aaron Arm is a neighbourhood in the town of Burgeo in Newfoundland and Labrador, Canada. It is named after the small bay of the same name.

See also 
 List of communities in Newfoundland and Labrador

Populated places in Newfoundland and Labrador